JAST USA is a publisher of English-language versions of Japanese video games, specifically bishōjo games, dating sims, visual novels and Japanese RPGs. It was founded in 1996, and their first game releases were Sakura Soft's Season of the Sakura and JAST's Three Sisters' Story. It has had several brands: Peach Princess, G-Collections, JAST Densetsu, and JAST Blue.

JAST USA was so named because it was originally affiliated with JAST (the Japanese company), but with the closure of JAST in 2000, the company created the subsidiary Peach Princess (because there was no longer a JAST to be affiliated with). As Peach Princess, the company published mostly Crowd and Will titles. In 2005, JAST acquired G-Collections from CD Bros., as it left the US market. In 2006, JAST USA merged its subsidiaries as JAST USA brands. In 2011, the brand JAST Densetsu was created with the goal of separating visual novels games away from the image of dating-sims. In 2015, all brands were folded back into the parent company, JAST USA, to improve overall brand recognition in a glowingly competitive market. In 2018 during Anime EXPO, its newer branch called JAST BLUE, which will focus towards Boys-love games, announced license acquirements of Nitro+chiral's titles sweet pool, Lamento: Beyond the Void, Togainu no Chi, DRAMAtical Murder and Slow Damage.

In addition to publishing their own games, JAST USA also acts as distributor for titles published by MangaGamer. In the past, they have also been the US distributor for games translated by the London-based company Otaku Publishing, Ltd., such as True Love.

Games published

This list are the titles from JAST USA, including ones from its past subsidiaries and acquisitions.

References

External links
JAST USA's official website

Hentai companies
Video game publishers